Alice Hausman (born July 31, 1942) is a Minnesota politician and former member of the Minnesota House of Representatives. As a member of the Minnesota Democratic–Farmer–Labor Party (DFL), she represented District 66A, which includes portions of the city of Saint Paul in Ramsey County, which is part of the Twin Cities metropolitan area. She is also a retired educator.

Education
Hausman graduated from Concordia College in Seward, Nebraska with a B.S. in Education, and then went on to Concordia College in River Forest, Illinois, earning her M.A. degree in Education.

Minnesota House of Representatives
Hausman was first elected in a 1989 special election after Rep. Ann Wynia resigned to accept an appointment by Governor Rudy Perpich as Commissioner of the Minnesota Department of Human Services. She has been re-elected every two years since then. Prior to the 1992 legislative redistricting, her district was known as 63B. She represented District 66B from 1993 to 2013. Due to redistricting, Hausman was forced to run for re-election in district 66A in 2012. She won re-election with about 63% of the vote.

Personal life
Hausman moved to Saint Paul in 1977.

References

External links 

 Rep. Hausman Web Page
 Minnesota Public Radio Votetracker: Rep. Alice Hausman
 Project Votesmart - Rep. Alice Hausman Profile
 Alice Hausman Campaign Web Site

1942 births
Living people
Concordia University Nebraska alumni
People from Ramsey County, Minnesota
Politicians from Saint Paul, Minnesota
Democratic Party members of the Minnesota House of Representatives
Women state legislators in Minnesota
21st-century American politicians
21st-century American women politicians
People from Marshall County, Kansas
20th-century American politicians
20th-century American women politicians